This is a list of the busiest airports in south-east Asia, ranked and itemised by its total passengers per year, which includes arrival, departure, and transit passengers.  Note that airports in Laos, Cambodia, Myanmar, and Brunei Darussalam are not listed here; due to either the lack of statistics, non-existent data, or for its lack of passenger numbers.

Airport statistics

2019 statistics
Port Authority of New York and New Jersey's (PANYNJ) full-year figures are as follows, unless indicated otherwise:

2017 statistics
Airports Council International's (ACI) full-year figures are as follows:

2016 statistics

See also

List of the busiest airports in Asia
Busiest airports by continent
World's busiest airports by passenger traffic
World's busiest airports by traffic movements
World's busiest airports by cargo traffic
World's busiest airports by international passenger traffic
World's busiest city airport systems by passenger traffic

References
Based on the Airports Council International Data Centre

 

 
 
Busiest
South-east Asia